Collège François-de-Laval (previously Petit Séminaire de Québec) is a private French-language Roman Catholic secondary school in the Vieux-Québec area of Quebec City, Quebec.

Origins and current status 
The school was founded in 1668, as part of the Séminaire de Québec. Until 1970, the Superior of the Seminary was also the Rector of Université Laval, which was originally an offshoot of it. In 1985, the seminary transferred the secondary school to a new secular not-for-profit organization, "le Collège François-de-Laval", which was given the right to use the "Petit Séminaire de Québec" name.

Another school, Le Petit Séminaire de Québec, campus de l'Outaouais was founded as a branch of the school in the Outaouais area of western Quebec.

A separate organization with a similar name, the Petit séminaire diocésain de Québec, is a residential school for boys considering the Roman Catholic priesthood, managed by the Séminaire de Québec.

Background 

Many French-Canadian clergy of the 18th and 19th century, as well as innumerable academics, went through the Petit Séminaire before higher education became widely accessible.

Of 867 students who lived at the Petit Séminaire during the French period, 198 graduated. Of these, 118 became priests or brothers, and 80 chose other occupations, according to research by historian Mgr Amédée Gosselin.

Notable graduates 

 Amable Berthelot, member of the Legislative Assembly of Lower Canada and the Legislative Assembly of the Province of Canada
 Pierre-Joseph-Olivier Chauveau (1829-1837), first Premier of Quebec
 Paul Fiset, microbiologist and developer of the Q fever vaccine

References

Further reading

External links

 
Petit séminaire diocésain de Québec

Catholic secondary schools in Quebec
Private schools in Quebec
High schools in Quebec
Schools in Quebec City
Old Quebec
Religion in Quebec City